Hybanthopsis is a genus of flowering plants in the violet family Violaceae, with a single accepted species (Hybanthopsis bahiensis), found in north-east Brazil.

Description 

Twining herbaceous Lianas with ovate-lanceolate leaves. The solitary flowers, with a violet corolla, are strongly zygomorphic (bilaterally symmetrical) with the very large bottom petal differentiated into a claw and blade and are saccate (pouch like) at the base. On the five stamens, the filaments are weakly connate (fused) with the two lowest anthers weakly calcarate (spurred) and possessing a large dorsal connective appendage that is entire and oblongovate. In the gynoecium, the style is filiform-rostellate (threadlike and beaked). The fruit is a thin walled elastic follicle dehiscing by a single longitudinal suture. There are several seeds per carpel, that are obovoid with a pair of basal-lateral expansions.

Taxonomy 

The genus Hybanthopsis was first described by Paula-Souza in 2003, with a single species, Hybanthopsis bahiensis which thus is considered the type species. Therefore, the genus bears the name, Paula-Souza, as the botanical authority. The genus resembled the previously described Hybanthus in floral structure, but with important distinctions in terms of seed and fruit morphology, which are unique among neotropical Violaceae. Only one species of Hybanthus is a twining plant, and the floral structure is quite different to two of the other lianescent genera, Anchietea and Calyptrion but closer to that of Agatea, while the seeds more closely resemble Anchietea.

Hybanthopsis is one of four lianescent genera in Violaceae, together with Calyptrion Ging., Agatea A.Gray and Anchietea Paula-Souza. Historically, these genera were distributed among separate subtribes, with Anchietea within subtribe Violinae with Calyptrion and Hybanthopsis and Agatea in subtribe Hybanthinae. Molecular phylogenetic studies have now grouped these four genera together into a single lianescent clade, one of four within the family Violaceae.

Etymology 

The genus Hybanthopsis is named after the genus Hybanthus from which it is differentiated, the suffix -opsis indicating similarity in Greek. The specific epithet bahiensis indicates its discovery in Bahia.

Species 

Hybanthopsis is a monotypic genus, with a single species:
 Hybanthopsis bahiensis Paula-Souza

Distribution and habitat 

Arid deciduous forests (caatingas) of central and east Bahia, North-east Brazil, particularly disturbed areas such as forest borders and the roadside.

References

Bibliography 

Books and theses
 
 
 
 
 

Articles

 
 
 

Websites
 
 
 
 
 

Violaceae
Monotypic Malpighiales genera